The Bhopal–Bilaspur Express/Passenger, is an express passenger train service running between Bhopal Junction railway station of Bhopal City, the capital city of Madhya Pradesh and Bilaspur in Chhattisgarh (formerly in Madhya Pradesh.)

Number and nomenclature
The train is  numbered 18235 – from Bhopal to Bilaspur, Chhattisgarh and 18236 – from Bilaspur, Chhattisgarh to Bhopal.

The train is commonly referred to as Bilaspur on both sides, signifying the name of the city of its destination and origin.

Arrival and departure info.
The train operates daily from both sides.
Train number 18235 departs from Bhopal Junction daily at 08:00 hrs, while on return, Train number 18236 arrives to Bhopal Nishatpura railway station in Bhopal at 17:30 hrs.

Route and stops

The train runs on the Bina–Katni rail route, with more than 63 stops. The train halts at suburban railway stations in addition to city railway stations. The major stations include :

Coach composition
The train is classified as a passenger train and does not have air conditioned coaches.

Average Speed and Frequency
Train no.18235 Bhopal – Bilaspur Express runs at an average speed of 54 km/h from Bhopal Junction till Khurai Railway Station. Then from Khurai Sumreri (the suburban railway station of Khurai), till Bilaspur, Chhattisgarh, its average speed reduces to 40 km/h.

Train no.18236 Bilaspur – Bhopal Passenger is solely a passenger train which halts at each and every stop till Bhopal with an average speed of 34 km/h.

The train operates daily from both cities, covering its total distance of 720 km in 23 hours.

Slip Service (link express)
18229/18230 Bhopal – Chirmiri Passenger

Other trains from Bhopal to Bilaspur
 Mahanadi Express (Cancelled)
 Narmada Express
 Amarkantak Express
 Gondwana Express
 Chhattisgarh Express
 New Delhi Bilaspur Rajdhani Express

External links
 Train schedule

References

 
 Bhopal

Railway services introduced in 1964
Transport in Bilaspur, Chhattisgarh
Rail transport in Madhya Pradesh
Transport in Bhopal
Express trains in India